Ash Lake, Clare  is a lake of Clare municipality, in Nova Scotia, Canada.

See also
List of lakes in Nova Scotia

References
 National Resources Canada

Lakes of Nova Scotia